The Veterans Memorial Building at 53 N. Center in American Fork, Utah was built in 1934.  It has also been known as American Fork Legion Hall and as Legion Memorial Building.   It was listed on the National Register of Historic Places in 1994.

References

Clubhouses on the National Register of Historic Places in Utah
Streamline Moderne architecture in the United States
Cultural infrastructure completed in 1934
Buildings and structures in American Fork, Utah
American Legion buildings
National Register of Historic Places in Utah County, Utah
1934 establishments in Utah